James Campion was a member of the Wisconsin State Assembly in 1883, representing the 1st District of Outagamie County, Wisconsin, and a portion of Calumet County, Wisconsin. He was a Democrat. Campion was born on January 17, 1824, in Ireland.

References

Irish emigrants to the United States (before 1923)
People from Outagamie County, Wisconsin
1824 births
Year of death missing
Democratic Party members of the Wisconsin State Assembly